Senecio pulcher is an ornamental plant native to the wet valleys & slopes and flooded rocky 
habitats in Argentina, Brazil, and Uruguay. Cited in Flora Brasiliensis
by Carl Friedrich Philipp von Martius.  After dusty miller (S. cineraria), S. pulcher is perhaps one of the most popular species of the genus for horticulture along with German ivy (Senecio mikanioides) and purple ragwort (Senecio elegans) or it was in 1917.

Description 

Distribution 

Horticulture 
Senecio pulcher is grown as an ornamental plant in the United States and Europe;
flowering in late summer; it is known to be hardy in southern New England in protected places with well drained soils, but its beauty can be marred by frost and bad weather.

A native perennial, as a captive, S. pulcher is an annual who is hesitant to ripen its seed; the gardeners continue the species with inch long root cuttings over-wintered in a pan of light sandy soil in a greenhouse.

References

External links
 

pulcher
Flora of Argentina
Flora of Brazil
Flora of Uruguay